Anthony Simonsen  (born January 6, 1997) is an American professional ten-pin bowler from Little Elm, Texas, currently residing in Las Vegas, Nevada. He has been a member of the Professional Bowlers Association (PBA) since 2014. Simonsen became known in bowling fan circles early in the 2016 season, when he earned the distinction as the youngest player in history to win a PBA major championship. He is now the youngest player in history to own four major PBA Tour titles. He uses the two-handed shovel-style delivery with a dominant right hand. At age 25, Simonsen eclipsed $1 million in career PBA earnings during the 2022 season.

Simonsen is a pro staff member for Roto Grip bowling balls and Vise Grips finger inserts.

Amateur accomplishments
As an 18-year-old, Simonsen captured a win in doubles (with partner Mark Sleeper, Jr.) at the 2015 USBC Open Championships.

Simonsen first earned a spot on Team USA in 2016. He and his Team USA teammates won the 2019 Weber Cup over Team Europe. Simonsen participated in 11 of the 32 matches, going 5–1 in singles, 1–2 in doubles, and 1–1 in team.

In the 2020 Weber Cup, Simonsen and Team USA again defeated Team Europe, 23–18. Overall in the event, Simonsen participated in 12 of 41 matches, going 4–1 in singles, 1–4 in doubles, and 1–1 in team. In his third singles match against England's Dom Barrett, Simonsen rolled a 300 game. Simonsen also competed in the 2021 Weber Cup. In the USA's 
17–18 loss to Team Europe, Simonsen participated in 12 of 35 matches, going 4–3 in singles, 2–0 in doubles, and 0–3 in team.

PBA career 
Simonsen became a PBA member in 2014 at age 17. This followed some success on the PBA regional circuit, where he won two Regional tournaments as a non-member. Simonsen has won nine PBA Tour titles (with three majors) and seven PBA Regional titles. He has rolled 7 career 300 games in PBA competition (through 2019). He also has one European Bowling Tour (EBT) title to his credit, earned at the 2018 Storm Irish Open.

2015 season
Simonsen made the cash-line cut in seven of 16 tournaments on the 2015 PBA Tour, and qualified for match play five times.

2016 season

Simonsen's first PBA Tour title came on December 18, 2015 at the Mark Roth/Marshall Holman PBA Doubles Championship, where he teamed with Connor Pickford. (This was considered a 2016 season title.) He was only two days older than Norm Duke when Duke won the 1983 PBA Cleveland Open.

Simonsen made history on February 14, 2016, when he won his first PBA Tour singles title and first major at the USBC Masters in Indianapolis. This win made Anthony the youngest player ever, at age 19 years and 39 days, to win a PBA major title.  PBA Hall of Famer Mike Aulby had held this distinction since 1979, when he won the PBA National Championship at age 19 years, 83 days. Simonsen qualified for two more televised finals in major tournaments during 2016, finishing fourth at the U.S. Open in November and fifth at the PBA World Championship in December. He appeared in the championship round (the final stage of a tournament) seven times this season.

2017 season

On February 26, 2017, Simonsen won the World Bowling Tour (WBT) Men's Finals in Las Vegas, NV, cashing $20,000. The finals included the top three points earners from 2015 and 2016 WBT events. While presented by the PBA, this event does not award a PBA title. Simonsen captured his third PBA title on May 29, 2017 at the PBA Xtra Frame Wilmington Open.

As one of the top eight money leaders from the start of the 2015 season through the 2017 USBC Masters, Simonsen was invited to participate in the inaugural Main Event PBA Tour Finals in May, 2017. He placed eighth in the event.

2018 season

Simonsen finished runner-up to Sweden's Jenny Wegner in the 2018 Brunswick Euro Challenge, held in Munich, Germany. Simonsen won a scratch victory of 213–211 in the final match, but because Wegner accepted the eight pins per game handicap offered to female competitors, Simonsen lost the match and a PBA title by an official score of 219–213. On August 19, Simonsen won his fourth PBA title at the Gene Carter's Pro Shop Classic in Middletown, Delaware. Simonsen gained some attention with this latest victory when he used a "backup ball" (a right-hander putting reverse rotation on the ball so it hooks like a left-hander's shot, or vice versa) during both match play and one of the finals matches after the right side of the lane had become difficult to play. While USBC and PBA rules do not allow a bowler to switch to his or her opposite hand for any sanctioned shot during a given season, Simonsen's technique was legal. He still used a dominant right hand, but rotated the ball in the opposite direction versus his conventional shot.

On October 16, Simonsen won his fifth PBA Tour title at the FloBowling PBA Wolf Open in Owasso, Oklahoma. Having qualified as the #1 seed, he won his lone championship round match over Andrew Anderson. With the win, Simonsen joined Jesper Svensson as the only players in history to have five PBA Tour titles by age 21.

2019 season
On February 17, 2019, Simonsen won his sixth PBA Tour title and second major at the 2019 PBA Players Championship in Columbus, Ohio. As the #2 seed in the stepladder finals, he defeated Kyle Troup in the semi-final match 259–202, then upset #1 seed Jason Belmonte (going for a record 11th major) in the final match 232–212 to claim the title. Simonsen's victory made him the youngest player (22) in PBA history to win two major championships. The previous record holder, Billy Hardwick, won his second major championship at age 23. With two majors and at least five titles overall, Simonsen is also the youngest player in history to become title-eligible for the PBA Hall of Fame.

Simonsen qualified as the #4 seed for the inaugural PBA Tour Playoffs. He made it to the Final Four on June 1, but lost in the semifinal to eventual champion Kristopher Prather.

On August 29, Simonsen won his seventh PBA Tour title in exciting fashion at the PBA Bear Open in Aurora, Illinois. After the final match against E. J. Tackett finished in a 267–267 tie, both Simonsen and Tackett recorded strikes on the first ball of sudden-death roll-off. Simonsen then struck on the second ball of sudden death, while Tackett rolled a 9-count, giving Anthony his second title of the 2019 season.

Overall in 2019, Simonsen made eight championship round appearances and cashed $171,340, both career highs. Simonsen won an additional $100,000 in the Bowlero Elite Series event on September 13, 2019, which is not counted in his PBA earnings.

2020 season
Simonsen qualified as the #1 seed for the finals of the 2020 U.S. Open, but lost the championship match to Jason Belmonte, 226–201. In the PBA World Championship finals on March 15, he again finished runner-up to Belmonte. Based on 2020 points, Simonsen qualified as the #4 seed for the season-ending PBA Tour Playoffs. He made it all the way to the championship match, only to suffer another runner-up finish, this time to Bill O'Neill. Despite the 2020 season being shortened by COVID-19, Simonsen posted a new career high in earnings with $227,130.

2021 season
After yet another runner-up finish in a major (2021 PBA Tournament of Champions), Simonsen finally broke through with his eighth title in the PBA Tour Finals on June 27. Having secured the #1 seed in Group 2 qualifying, Simonsen topped Kris Prather in his group stepladder final, then defeated Group 1 winner Kyle Troup for the championship.

2022 season

On February 6, 2022, Simonsen won his ninth PBA Tour title and third major at the 2022 U.S. Open, held in Indianapolis, Indiana. Qualifying as the #2 seed for the stepladder finals, he defeated Jason Belmonte in the semifinal match and E. J. Tackett in the championship match to claim the victory. The win makes Simonsen the youngest bowler in PBA history (25 years, 31 days) to win three major titles. The previous record holder was PBA Hall of Famer Dave Davis, who won his third major in 1968 at age 25 years, 343 days. On April 3, Simonsen won his tenth PBA Tour title, fourth major, and second major of the 2022 season, narrowly defeating Hall of Famer Norm Duke in the final match at the USBC Masters, 219-216. Simonsen is now one of nine players in history to win multiple Masters titles, and is the first player to win both the U.S. Open and USBC Masters during the same season since Mike Aulby did so in 1989. At age 25 years, 87 days, Simonsen is also the youngest player in history to claim four PBA major championships.

2023 season

On February 24, 2023, Simonsen won his eleventh PBA Tour title at the PBA Wichita Classic. Qualifying as the #1 seed, he defeated Dom Barrett 257–213 in the championship match to claim the victory. Two weeks later, Simonsen qualified as the top seed for the PBA Dave Small's Jackson Classic, but lost the March 9 championship match to E. J. Tackett.

PBA Tour Titles
Major tournament titles are in bold type.

 2016: PBA Mark Roth-Marshall Holman Doubles Championship (w/Connor Pickford) (Reno, NV)
 2016: USBC Masters (Indianapolis, IN)
 2017: PBA Xtra Frame Wilmington Open (Wilmington, NC)
 2018: PBA Xtra Frame Gene Carter's Pro Shop Open (Middletown, DE)
 2018: FloBowling PBA Wolf Open (Owasso, OK)
 2019: PBA Players Championship (Columbus, OH)
 2019: FloBowling PBA Bear Open (Aurora, IL)
 2021: PBA Tour Finals (Allen Park, MI)
 2022: U.S. Open (Indianapolis, IN)
 2022: USBC Masters (Las Vegas, NV)
 2023: PBA Wichita Classic (Shawnee, OK)

Career statistics

Statistics are through the last complete PBA season.

+CRA = Championship Round Appearances

Simonsen: Leave it Behind
Simonsen is the namesake of the 2019 FloBowling documentary Simonsen: Leave it Behind. The documentary examines Simonsen's childhood grind and path to professional
bowling superstardom. It is available via the FloBowling website and is exclusive to the service's subscribers.

References 

American ten-pin bowling players
1997 births
Living people